Viswanathan Velai Venum is a 1985 Indian Tamil language film directed by Raghuram in his debut. The film stars Karthik and Anand Babu. It was released on 27 July 1985.

Plot

Cast 
Karthik as Ashok
Anand Babu as Kumar
Jeevitha as Sujatha
Anitha Reddy as Janani
Thengai Srinivasan as Vishwanathan
Y. G. Mahendran
Nalinikanth
Kallapetti Singaram

Soundtrack 
The soundtrack was composed by Shankar–Ganesh.

References

External links 
 

1985 films
1980s Tamil-language films
Films scored by Shankar–Ganesh